Kent Creek may refer to:
 Kent Creek (Washington)
 Kent Creek (Lake Erie)
 Kent Creek (California)